Harry Reid (d. 2021) was a former Democratic senior United States senator from Nevada (1987–2017), Senate Majority Leader (2007–2015), and Senate Minority Leader (2015-2017).  Retiring in January 2017, he did not file to run in the 2016 Senate elections. 

Reid previously served as a Senate Minority Leader (2005–2007), Senate Minority Whip (1999–2001, 2001 and 2003–2005), Senate Majority Whip (2001, 2001–2003), United States Representative (1983–1987) and Lieutenant Governor of Nevada (1971–1975).

Nevada 
Lieutenant Governor of Nevada, 1970, Democratic Primary:
 Harry Reid - 44,920 (82.15%)
 Lee Peer - 9,760 (17.85%)
Lieutenant Governor of Nevada, 1970:
 Harry Reid (D) – 78,994 (54.83%)
 Robert N. Broadbent (R) – 65,078 (45.17%)

U.S. Congressional elections 
Nevada's 1st congressional district, 1982, Democratic Primary:
 Harry Reid - 41,786 (77.87%)
 None of the above - 4,248 (7.92%)
 D. A. Rolfe - 3,214 (5.99%)
 Ray Ford - 2,946 (5.49%)
 P.J. Brooks, Jr. - 1,468 (2.74%)
Nevada's 1st congressional district, 1982:
 Harry Reid (D) – 61,901 (57.54%)
 Peggy Cavnar (R) – 45,675 (42.46%)

Nevada's 1st congressional district, 1984:
 Harry Reid (D) (inc.) – 73,242 (56.12%)
 Peggy Cavnar (R) – 55,391 (42.44%)
 Joe Morris (LBT) – 1,885 (1.44%)

U.S. Senate elections 
Democratic primary for the United States Senate from Nevada, 1974:
 Harry Reid – 44,768 (58.62%)
 Maya Miller – 25,738 (33.70%)
 Dan Miller – 5,869 (7.68%)

United States Senate election in Nevada, 1974:
 Paul Laxalt (R) – 79,605 (46.97%)
 Harry Reid (D) – 78,981 (46.60%)
 Jack C. Doyle (Independent American) – 10,887 (6.42%)

Democratic primary for the United States Senate from Nevada, 1986:
 Harry Reid – 74,275 (82.71%)
 None of These Candidates – 8,486 (9.45%)
 Manny Beals – 7,039 (7.84%)

United States Senate election in Nevada, 1986:
 Harry Reid (D) – 130,955 (50.00%)
 James Santini (R) – 116,606 (44.52%)
 None of the Above – 9,472 (3.62%)
 H. Kent Cromwell (LBT) – 4,899 (1.87%)

Democratic primary for the United States Senate from Nevada, 1992:
 Harry Reid (inc.) – 64,828 (52.82%)
 Charles Woods – 48,364 (39.40%)
 None of These Candidates – 4,429 (3.61%)
 Norman E. Hollingsworth – 3,253 (2.65%)
 God Almighty (actually Emil Tolotti Jr.) – 1,869 (1.52%)

United States Senate election in Nevada, 1992:
 Harry Reid (D) (inc.) – 253,150 (51.05%)
 Demar Dahl (R) – 199,413 (40.21%)
 None of the Above – 13,154 (2.65%)
 Joe S. Garcia, Sr. (Independent American) – 11,240 (2.27%)
 Lois Avery (Natural Law) – 7,279 (1.47%)
 H. Kent Cromwell (LBT) – 7,222 (1.46%)
 Harry Tootle (Populist) – 4,429 (0.89%)

United States Senate election in Nevada, 1998:
 Harry Reid (D) (inc.) – 208,650 (47.88%)
 John Ensign (R) – 208,222 (47.78%)
 None of the Above – 8,125 (1.86%)
 Michael Cloud (LBT) – 8,044 (1.85%)
 Michael E. Williams (Natural Law) – 2,749 (0.63%)

United States Senate election in Nevada, 2004:
 Harry Reid (D) (inc.) – 494,805 (61.08%)
 Richard Ziser (R) – 284,640 (35.14%)
 None of the Above – 12,968 (1.60%)
 Tom Hurst (LBT) – 9,559 (1.18%)
 David K. Schumann (Independent American) – 6,001 (0.74%)
 Gary Marinch (Natural Law) – 2,095 (0.26%)
Democratic primary for the United States Senate from Nevada, 2010
 Harry Reid (inc.) - 87,366 (75.32%)
 None of these candidates - 12,335 (10.63%)
 Alex Miller - 9,715 (8.38%)
 Eduardo "Mr. Clean" Hamilton - 4,644 (4.00%)
 Carlo Poliak - 1,938 (1.67%)
United States Senate election in Nevada, 2010
 Harry Reid (D) (inc.) – 362,785 (50.29%)
 Sharron Angle (R) – 321,361 (44.55%)
 None of these candidates – 16,197 (2.25%)
 Scott Ashjian – 5,811 (0.81%)
 Michael Haines – 4,261 (0.59%)
 Tim Fasano – 3,185 (0.44%)
 Jesse Holland – 3,175 (0.44%)
 Jeffery Reeves – 2,510 (0.35%)
 Wil Stand – 2,119 (0.29%)

Las Vegas Mayoral Election 

Non-partisan primary for Mayor of Las Vegas, 1975
Harry Reid - 8,471 (36.22%)
 William H. Briare - 5,316 (22.73%)
Ronald P. "Ron" Lurie - 4,960 (21.21%)
Henry H. "Hank" Thornley - 3,207 (13.71%)
others - 1,432 (6.13%)

Non-partisan general election for Mayor of Las Vegas, 1975
Harry Reid - 11,954 (47.4%)
 William H. Briare - 13,264 (52.6%)

Leadership elections 
Senate Democratic Leader (minority), 2004:
 Harry Reid – 45 (100%)

Senate Democratic Leader, 2006 (majority):
 Harry Reid (inc.) – 51 (100%)

Senate Democratic Leader, 2008 (majority):
 Harry Reid (inc.) – 57 (100%)

Table 
 Nevada law since 1975 allows dissatisfied voters to vote for "None of These Candidates."

References

Reid, Harry